Perception is the third studio album by American rapper NF. It was released on October 6, 2017, through Capitol Records alongside NF's newly launched label NF Real Music. The album was entirely produced by American producers Tommee Profitt and David Garcia, and features a guest performance from American singer Ruelle. 

Perception was preceded by the release of the singles including "Outro", "Green Lights", "Let You Down", "Lie", and "If You Want Love". The album charted at number one on the Billboard 200, and received generally positive reviews from music critics.

Background and release 
"Outro" was released on August 2, 2017, as the first single from a then unnamed upcoming album. Fans speculated that the album's title would be Perception based on information found in the “Green Lights” music video. Three days before the album's release, NF released the single "Let You Down", which would become his first song to chart on the Billboard Hot 100 chart. In an interview with Rap.de, NF explained the album was about his perception, though it could be "from anyone in the world".

Critical reception

CCM Magazines Matt Conner gave the album 4 out of 5 stars, saying "The maturity and musical experimentation grows on Perception, yet the dynamism and authenticity remain firmly in place." David Craft of Jesus Freak Hideout gave the album a below-average review, awarding it two out of five stars due to a lack of originality and redundancy. He stated that "Perception essentially consists of NF spending an hour yelling at listeners about his thinly-veiled insecurities while simultaneously bragging about how great he is" and that there were a few "glimmers of quality", but that "NF exercises neither patience nor humility on Perception." Kevin Hoskins, also of Jesus Freak Hideout, gave a more positive "second opinion" review, giving it 3.5 out of 5 stars, saying the album's biggest flaw was that it is "very one-dimensional" but praised the album for its continuity of emotional lyrics and thematic production from NF's previous albums by saying "Perception does not offer fans anything exceptionally new, but current fans will truly appreciate the fire Nate spits on these highly emotional rap tunes. As always, the thematic production is easily noticed making this a complete NF album, even though it falls short of his previous discography."

Neil Z. Yeung of AllMusic gave the album 3.5 out of 5, describing the album as a "heavy and serious listen" and described NF's lyrics as "continually engrossing".

Commercial performance
Perception debuted at No. 1 on the US Billboard 200 with 55,000 album-equivalent units, including 38,000 pure album sales in its first week, becoming both NF's first US top 10 and No. 1 album. In its second week, the album fell to No. 25 with 18,000 album-equivalent units of which 5,000 were in traditional album sales. On March 22, 2018, the album was certified gold by the Recording Industry Association of America (RIAA) for combined sales and album-equivalent units of over 500,000 units in the United States. On January 11, 2019, the album was certified platinum by the RIAA for sales of over 1,000,000 units in the United States.

As of August 2019, the album has earned 1.1 million equivalent album units, with 160,000 coming from album sales.

Track listing
All songs produced by Tommee Profitt and David Garcia. Credits adapted from Tidal.

Personnel
Credits adapted from Tidal.

Musicians

 NF – vocals, composer 
 Brendon Coe – composer 
 Cameron Doyle – composer 
 Elley Duhé – composer 
 Mike Elizondo – composer 
 David Garcia – composer 
 Devin Guisande – composer 
 Kyle Guisande – composer 
 Tommee Profitt – composer 
 Ruelle – guest vocals 

Production
 Vinnie Alibrandi – post-producer
 Chris Athens – mastering 
 Mike Bozzi – mastering 
 David Garcia – producer 
 Tommee Profitt – producer 

Design
 NF – art direction
 Jon Taylor Sweet – photography
 Joshua Wurzelbacher – art direction, package design

Charts

Weekly charts

Year-end charts

Certifications

References

2017 albums
NF (rapper) albums